The Sham Pistols were a short-lived punk rock supergroup composed of guitarist Steve Jones and drummer Paul Cook of the Sex Pistols, with vocalist Jimmy Pursey and bass player Dave Tregunna of Sham 69. Although now referred to as The Sham Pistols no name had been decided upon at the time. There was the possibility that they may have been called the Sex Pistols.

Formation
After the break up of Sex Pistols in January 1978 guitarist Steve Jones and drummer Paul Cook were looking to form a new band. Various names were put forward as new bandmates including Bob Geldof who had sung live with the Thin Lizzy/Cook/Jones band The Greedies but it was vocalist Jimmy Pursey and bass player Dave Tregunna from fellow punk band Sham 69 who were recruited. Pursey and Jones had previously joined together to guest on a song with The Clash in July 78 at London's Music Machine. Steve Dior of The London Cowboys and The Idols stated in the liner notes for The London Cowboys CD Relapse that he jammed with Cook and Jones at Denmark Street with the idea of forming a band. He stated that "When they started to consider Jimmy Pursey for the vocal spot I decided to leave. At the time we were called The Bollock Brothers". Paul Cook told Gary Bushell of Sounds in July 1979 "Jim (Pursey) is the only person who's come along who we can get on with. E's the same as us, see". At what was intended to be Sham 69's final concert at the Glasgow Apollo Theatre on 29 June 1979 Jones and Cook had joined Sham onstage for the encore of "Pretty Vacant", "White Riot", "If the Kids Are United" and "What Have We Got".

In July 1979, Pursey told the NME that they had recorded 10 songs — seven originals and three cover versions — and that they would be ready to tour by September that year. Among the songs the group were planning to play live were "Silly Thing", "Lonely Boy", "Submission" and "Pretty Vacant" from the Sex Pistols and "Joey's on the Street" and "If the Kids are United" from Sham 69. In the liner notes to the CD The Complete Professionals Phil Singleton states that songs run through in the studio on 6 and 9 August included "Some Play Dirty", "Natural Born Killer", "Silly Thing", "Here We Go Again" "1-2-3" and "Kamikaze".

Sham 69 were still contractually bound to deliver a further two albums for Polydor and with Cook and Jones signed to Virgin this meant Virgin coming to an arrangement with Polydor. Pursey had wanted to use the name 'The Sex Pistols' while Paul Cook later stated that he and Jones had no intention of using the name. Pursey had told Gary Bushell "Now I feel that the Pistols can be a band that have something to say. We're not digging the name up just to make money out of it like Virgin did with Vicious". Simon Draper, Managing Director of Virgin Records told Melody Maker "Whoever joins Cook and Jones will be part of the Sex Pistols".

Recordings
Time was spent recording at Manor Studios in Oxfordshire where "Natural Born Killer" was produced. This was later reworked as The Professionals' "Kick Down the Doors". Another song "Some Play Dirty" was quoted with lyrics by Pursey in an interview with Nick Kent in the NME of October 1979. "Some Play Dirty" was later reworked as The Professionals'  song "Mods, Skins, Punks" which appeared on the later to be abandoned LP recorded with Andy Allan but which didn't make it on to their debut LP proper, I Didn't See it Coming. The studio recordings of "Natural Born Killer" and "Some Play Dirty" didn't see the light of day for over 30 years, but the encore at the Glasgow Apollo was released on Sham's Last Stand and Sham 69 Live in Glasgow 1979. The latter mistakenly credits the Sham song "George Davis is Innocent" (also known as "The Cockney Kids are Innocent" and "Everybody's Innocent") as the Sex Pistols' "No One is Innocent".

In January 2010, a bootleg vinyl album emerged entitled Sham Pistols - Natural Born Killer. This includes four studio tracks said to be recorded by the Sham Pistols in June 1979 at Manor Studios but only Natural Born Killer is by the Sham Pistols. The vinyl album also included the previously released encore at the Glasgow Apollo.

In October 2015 the Sham Pistols tracks "Some Play Dirty" and "Natural Born Killer" were released on the UMC/Mercury triple CD set "The Complete Professionals". Although Pursey wrote the lyrics to these tracks he is not listed on the songwriting credits.

Breakup
On 19 August, Cook walked out of a recording session with Jones saying "It's worse than working with Johnny Rotten". Jones had told Smash Hits in the July 79 edition that "We couldn't believe it when we met him (Pursey). He was all mouth and he cried - stuff like that. He's too emotional. All he wanted to do was be a Sex Pistol". He added "We thought that we'd get a load of money for doing something that wasn't too bad. We could have made a load of money but he just put us off it". Jones wrote in his autobiography Lonely Boy "When me and Cookie gave Jimmy a try, it was never going to be the Sex Pistols in our minds, we always thought of it as a new group. The odd thing about it was that we liked him, but when we got together to try and write some songs in a studio out in the country, he couldn't fucking come up with anything. His cover was blown - he didn't have the talents or intelligence that Rotten did, nowhere near". Pursey stated "It was absurd, the difference between us, when we got into the studio. Then I knew it could never work out". In July Sham 69 guitarist Dave Parsons had prophetically told Gary Bushell "I don't think it's gonna last that long cos Jim always likes to be 100% in control". After the dissolution of the band, Cook and Jones went on to form The Professionals and Pursey moved on to solo projects, later reforming Sham 69.

Discography

Sham Pistols - Natural Born Killer

Studio Side
"Natural Born Killer"
"You & Me" (Sham 69)
"Trainspotter" (Sham 69)
"Individual" (Sham 69)
(Manor Studios June '79)

Live Side
"Pretty Vacant"
"White Riot"
"If the Kids Are United"
"What Have We Got"
(Glasgow Apollo June '79)

Other
 Sham's Last Stand (1993)  -  Dojo DOJOCD95 & Snapper SMMCD 540
 Sham 69 Live in Glasgow 1979 (2001)  -  Sanctuary Records CMRCD351
 Sham Pistols Natural Born Killer (PunkClassics 2010)  -  PCLP57016
 The Complete Professionals - The Professionals - UMC / Mercury 5363279

References

Books
 
 
 
 

English punk rock groups
Musical groups established in 1979
Musical groups disestablished in 1979
Sex Pistols